James Francis Doyle (December 21, 1886 – February 1, 1912) was a professional baseball infielder he played for two seasons in Major League Baseball for the Cincinnati Reds and Chicago Cubs. Doyle played in college at Niagara University. Doyle's appendix burst early in 1912, killing him.

See also
 List of baseball players who died during their careers

References

External links

1886 births
1912 deaths
Major League Baseball third basemen
Cincinnati Reds players
Chicago Cubs players
Baseball players from Detroit
Niagara Purple Eagles baseball players
Louisville Colonels (minor league) players